In music, Op. 124 stands for Opus number 124. Compositions that are assigned this number include:

 Arnold – Symphony No. 8
 Beethoven – The Consecration of the House
 Reger – An die Hoffnung
 Schumann – Albumblätter